Madduvalasa is a village in the Vangara mandal of Srikakulam district, Andhra Pradesh, India.

Demographics
The villagers speak the Telugu language. The total population of Madduvalasa is 600 (325 males and 275 females), living in 133 houses.

Madduvalasa Reservoir
Madduvalasa Reservoir has been built on the Vegavati and Suvarnamukhi rivers, subsidiaries of the Nagavali River at Madduvalasa. It was commissioned in  1977 and completed in 2002. About  of land was brought under cultivation with the water.

The seven villages of Patuvardhanam, Devikiwada, Chinna Devikiwada, CBR Peta, Nukalavada, Narendrapuram and Gitanapalli, comprising about 2,240 families, were adjacent to the Full Reservoir Level (FRL). They were identified for a rehabilitation package involving an expenditure of  270 million.

References

Villages in Vangara mandal